Ruente is a municipality in Cantabria, Spain. It is situated in the lowest part of the Cabuerniga valley and it is the biggest village in the zone.

La Fuentona

Ruente is well known for its natural water source, La Fuentona, and the medieval bridge and modern park which are situated next to it.

References

Municipalities in Cantabria